The Lieutenant Governor’s Award for High Achievement in the Arts , previously called the Excellence Awards Program, is an award given annually by the New Brunswick Arts Board to recognise outstanding contribution by artists to the arts in New Brunswick.

Recipients

 High Achievement in Literary Arts
 Robert Pichette – 2017
 M. Travis Lane – 2016
 Jacques Savoie – 2015
 Anne Compton – 2014
 Melvin Gallant – 2013
 Myrtis Theresa Dohaney – 2012
 France Daigle – 2011
 Beth Powning – 2010
 Raymond Fraser – 2009
Rino Morin Rossignol – 2009

 High Achievement in Performing Arts
 Ray Legere - 2019
 Stephen Tobias – 2017
 Jules Boudreau – 2015
 Igor Dobrovolskiy – 2014
 Jenny Munday – 2013
 Edith Butler – 2012
 Patrick Clark – 2011
 Chantal Cadieux – 2010
 Calixte Duguay – 2010
 Marcel-Romain Thériault – 2009
 High Achievement in Visual Arts
 Peter Powning – 2017
 Suzanne Hill – 2016
 Thaddeus Holownia – 2015
 Anna Torma – 2014
 Janice Wright-Cheney – 2013
 David Umholtz – 2012
 Yvon Gallant – 2011
 Roméo Savoie – 2009

References

Canadian art awards